Greystone or GREYSTONE (abbreviation: GST) is the former secret codeword of a Sensitive Compartmented Information compartment containing information about rendition, interrogation and counter-terrorism programs of the CIA, operations that began shortly after the September 11 Attacks. It covers covert actions in the Middle East that include pre-military operations in Afghanistan and drone attacks.

The abbreviation GST was first revealed in December 2005, in a Washington Post-article by Dana Priest, which says that GST includes programs for capturing suspected Al-Qaeda terrorists, for transporting them with aircraft, for maintaining secret prisons in various foreign countries and for the use of special interrogation methods which are held illegal by many lawyers. In 2009, the GST-abbreviation was accidentally confirmed in a declassified document written by the Justice Department's Office of Legal Counsel in 2004. 

The full codeword was revealed in the 2013 book Deep State, Inside the Government Secrecy Industry by Marc Ambinder and D.B. Grady. It says that the GREYSTONE compartment contains more than a dozen sub-compartments, which are identified by numbers (shown like GST-001). This makes sure that these sub-programs are only known to those people who are directly involved.

References 

Central Intelligence Agency operations
Counterterrorism in the United States